Remo Drive is an American rock band from Bloomington, Minnesota. They are currently signed to Epitaph Records. They released their first full length album titled Greatest Hits on March 16, 2017. Their second studio album Natural, Everyday Degradation was released on May 31, 2019. Their third, A Portrait of an Ugly Man, was released on June 26, 2020.

History
Remo Drive began in 2013, Erik and Stephen Paulson were in High School when they saw kids wearing Title Fight shirts, They both got into the band and decided they wanted to make music like them. The band started recording demos in 2013, also known as EP 1. They met their drummer Sam Mathys when Stephen was in a different band with him and asked if he wanted to jam with them, Later in 2014 they started releasing a collection of songs on the website Bandcamp under the title Demos 2014, This was the band's first time recording with Mathys including EPs such as Away and Stay Out Longer. The band got its name when bassist Stephen Paulson decided to incorporate the drum brand, Remo, into a band name. In 2015 Mathys left the band due to creative differences, They had Austin Voigt Fill in for him. The same year Remo Drive released an EP titled Wait For The Sun on Lost State Records. Also in 2015, Remo Drive released a split with the band Unturned as well as a split with the band Weathered, before releasing their 7" single Breathe In / Perfume on Really Rad Records and Endless Bummer Records in November. In Early 2016 Voigt left the band due to personal hardship, and Mathys rejoined the band. In March 2016 they began working on their first LP. In March 2017, Remo Drive self-released their first full-length album, Greatest Hits, featuring tracks "Yer Killin Me", "Art School", and "Crash Test Rating".

In Early 2018, Mathys announced on social media that he had been removed as a member of Remo Drive in December 2017.

In February 2018, the band announced that they had signed with Epitaph Records. This announcement came alongside the release of a single, Blue Ribbon, from their EP Pop Music, which was released on March 9.

In late August 2018, Remo Drive announced that they were planning on recording a new album that December. On April 22, 2019, the band released a double A-side single, "Two Bux/The Grind," ahead of their sophomore effort Natural, Everyday Degradation on May 31.

In May of that year, Erik Paulson announced that he hid promo CDs of the next single around Twin Cities, Minnesota, before releasing "Around the Sun" as a single on May 14.

In late 2019, Remo Drive posted on social media that they were working on their third album, A Portrait of an Ugly Man, which was properly announced on April 28, 2020 for a June release, along with the first single, "Star Worship" on the same day. Two other singles were released, "Ode to Joy 2" on May 18, 2020 and "A Flower and a Weed" on June 17, 2020. The album released on June 26, 2020, along with another single "Easy as That".

Musical style
Remo Drive's earlier work is typically described as emo that incorporates elements of pop punk, dance punk, post-hardcore, and in some tracks/recordings grunge and punk rock. The group has also self described themselves as emo and associated themselves with the emo revival. In recent years, the group has progressed into a more indie rock inspired sound with influence from power pop, indie pop, alternative rock, classic rock, and hard rock.  The band has listed a number of acts as influences including Title Fight, The Police, PUP, Jeff Rosenstock, Vampire Weekend, Weezer, The Strokes, The Smiths, Queens of the Stone Age and Arctic Monkeys.

Personnel
Current members

Erik Paulson – vocals, guitar (2013–present)
Stephen Paulson – bass (2013–present)
Sam Becht – drums, percussion (live, 2018–present; studio, 2019–present)

Former members

Sam Mathys – drums, percussion (2013–2014, 2016–2018)
Austin Voigt – drums, percussion (2014–2016)

Touring members
Dane Folie – guitar (2019–present)

Former touring members

Zack Cummings – guitar (2016–2019)
Braeden Keenan – drums, percussion (2016, 2018)
Lee Tran – saxophone, synthesizer, tambourine (2017–2019)
William J Leach - guitar (2019)

Discography
Studio albums
Greatest Hits (2017)
Natural, Everyday Degradation (2019)
A Portrait of an Ugly Man (2020)
EPs
Remo Drive EP 1 (2013)
Away (2014)
Stay Out Longer (2014)
Wait For The Sun (2015)
Pop Music (2018)
Natural, Everyday Extended Play (2019)
Splits
Remo Drive/Unturned (2015)
Remo Drive/Weathered (2015)
Singles
"Rainman" / "Stable" (2013)
"Pulp Friction" (2013)
"Breathe In" / "Perfume" (2015)
"Lookin' Under The Tree" (2016)
"Yer Killin' Me" (2017)
"Crash Test Rating" (2017)
"Eat Shit" (2017)
"Art School" (2017)
"I'm My Own Doctor" (2017)
"Blue Ribbon" (2018)
"Two Bux" / "The Grind" (2019)
"Around the Sun" (2019)
"Nearly Perfect" (2019)
"Romeo" (2019)
"Shakin' (Erik Paulson Mix)" (2019)
"Star Worship" (2020)
"Ode to Joy 2" (2020)
"A Flower and a Weed" (2020)
Demos
Demos 2014 (2014)
Live Performances
Audiotree Live on Audiotreetv (2017)
Bootlegs
Songs I Think Rock (2019)

Music videos

 "Heartstrings" (2015)
 "Lookin' Under The Tree" (2016)
 "Yer Killin' Me" (2017)
 "Crash Test Rating" (2017)
 "Eat Shit" (2017)
 "Art School" (2017)
 "I'm My Own Doctor" (2017)
 "Blue Ribbon" (2018)
 "Around the Sun" (2019)
"Romeo" (2019)
"Star Worship" (2020)
"Ode to Joy 2" (2020)
"Easy as That" (2020)

References

Musical groups from Minnesota
American emo musical groups
Musical groups established in 2014
2014 establishments in Minnesota